Aston Cantlow Halt railway station is a disused railway station half a mile north of the village of Aston Cantlow, Warwickshire, England. There was a corrugated iron waiting hut with a wooden bench inside. Although there was no goods yard or sidings the station was lit by lights tended by the station master from Great Alne.

History
The station, opened in 1922, was located on Great Western Railway's Bearley to Alcester line. Although the line itself was opened many years earlier in 1876 it wasn't until after the First World War that residents demands were met at Aston Cantlow. It stayed part of the GWR following the Grouping of 1923.

The station then closed under this management just before the Second World War due to wartime economy. It was reopened in 1941 but was rarely used and finally closed for good in 1944. After the track was taken up the station site became overgrown and, as of 2010, little or no evidence can be found of the station.

References

External links
Aston Cantlow Halt on navigable old O. S. map
Aston Cantlow Station

Disused railway stations in Warwickshire
Railway stations in Great Britain opened in 1922
Railway stations in Great Britain closed in 1939
Former Great Western Railway stations